Sir Sitwell Sitwell, 1st Baronet (September 1769 – 14 July 1811) was a British politician and landowner.

Sitwell was the son of Francis Hurt (1728–1793) of Mount Pleasant, Sheffield, who changed his name to Sitwell in 1777, when he inherited the Renishaw Hall, Derbyshire estates of his mother's cousin, and who in 1793 inherited Barmoor Castle from a Phipps relative. Sitwell came to his father's estates in 1793 and greatly extended and improved Renishaw Hall between 1800 and 1803. He was member of parliament for West Looe from 1796 to 1802. In 1808 he was created a baronet, of Renishaw in the County of Derby.

Sitwell married twice, firstly to Alice Parke, daughter of Thomas Parke in 1791 and secondly to Sarah Stovin in 1798. He was succeeded by his son Sir George Sitwell, 2nd Baronet.

His daughter Anne married Sir Frederick Stovin in 1815; this was an unusual marriage, as Stovin was the younger brother of Sarah, Sitwell's second wife and Anne's stepmother.

His memorial is in St Peter and St Paul's Church, Eckington.

References
  Sitwell family history

Baronets in the Baronetage of the United Kingdom
1769 births
1811 deaths
Members of the Parliament of Great Britain for English constituencies
British MPs 1796–1800
Members of the Parliament of Great Britain for constituencies in Cornwall
Members of the Parliament of the United Kingdom for English constituencies
Members of the Parliament of the United Kingdom for constituencies in Cornwall
UK MPs 1801–1802
Sitwell family
High Sheriffs of Derbyshire